Alberto Rodríguez (born 9 October 1964) is a Cuban wrestler. He competed in the men's freestyle 74 kg at the 1996 Summer Olympics.

References

1964 births
Living people
Cuban male sport wrestlers
Olympic wrestlers of Cuba
Wrestlers at the 1996 Summer Olympics
People from Pinar del Río
Pan American Games medalists in wrestling
Pan American Games gold medalists for Cuba
Pan American Games bronze medalists for Cuba
Wrestlers at the 1991 Pan American Games
Wrestlers at the 1995 Pan American Games
Medalists at the 1991 Pan American Games
20th-century Cuban people
21st-century Cuban people